Eliza Sophie Caird (born 15 April 1988), better known by her stage name Eliza (formerly Eliza Doolittle), is an English singer and songwriter from Westminster, London. After performing her music in live venues around London from the age of 15, Eliza signed to Parlophone in 2008.

Her debut album was released on 12 July 2010 and went Platinum. 
The album produced two UK top 40 hits: "Skinny Genes" and "Pack Up", the latter of which peaked within the top five on the UK Singles Chart.

In 2013, Eliza contributed writing and vocals to "You & Me" a single from British electronic music duo Disclosure's number one debut album Settle.

On 7 June 2013, she premiered a single called "Big When I Was Little", which was released in July 2013. It subsequently joined BBC Radio 1's and Radio 2 playlist. It was later included on her second studio album, titled In Your Hands.

In 2018 ELIZA released the album "A Real Romantic" which includes songs "Wasn't Looking", "Livid" and "Alone & Unafraid".  She performed "Wasn't Looking' on Youtube's "Colors" channel which is currently at 26 million views (March 2023).

In 2022 ELIZA released the album "A Sky Without Stars".  Including songs "Straight Talker", "Heat of the Moon", "Dripping", "Everywhere I'll Ever Be" & "A Tear for the Dreadful".

Early life
Eliza was born in Westminster, London. She comes from a family with a successful and varied musical background. Her father is John Caird, a stage director and writer of plays, musicals and operas who is also an honorary associate director of the Royal Shakespeare Company.

Her paternal grandfather G. B. Caird, was the theologian and principal of Mansfield College, Oxford. Her mother is musical theatre actress and artist Frances Ruffelle, who won a Tony Award for her role of Éponine in the English-language version of Les Misérables. Eliza is the granddaughter of Sylvia Young, founder of the eponymous theatre school. She is one of 9 siblings. Her parents divorced when she was four years old.

Eliza had a brief career on stage playing Young Cosette in Les Misérables in London's West End in 1996–1997. Her parents had met and began their relationship during the original production when her father was the co-director and her mother played Eponine. Eliza went on to play the lead role in Lucy Simon's Tony Award-winning musical version of The Secret Garden in 2001, when The Royal Shakespeare Company premiered the show in London.

Musical career

Career beginnings
Before entering the charts, Eliza toured the UK with her band. She released and EP including songs Naive produced by Al Shux (A New York State of Mind), Ego and Piano Song produced by Truth & Soul (Lee Fields, El Michels Affair). On 29 November 2009 a further EP release featuring the tracks "Rollerblades", "Moneybox", "Police Car" and "Go Home" produced by Craigie Dodds, Johnny Dollar, Matt Prime and Phil Thornaley. Tracks from the EP were remixed by Plastic Little ("Rollerblades"), Sam Young and Jamie xx from The xx ("Money Box"). The EP received radio plays from Rob Da Bank, Nick Grimshaw, Fearne Cotton and Jo Whiley.

She recorded a song called 'Running For Life' which featured on the soundtrack of the cult British film Adulthood in 2008. Later that year, she performed at Glastonbury on the Pussy Parlour stage, her first festival performance.

2010–2013: Eliza Doolittle

In early 2010, she took part in musician Shane MacGowan's charity single "I Put a Spell on You", in aid of the 2010 Haiti earthquake. Her debut single "Skinny Genes" was released on 12 April 2010, reaching No. 22 in the UK Singles Chart. She told BBC's Steve Lamacq the song is "a funny scenario if you didn't like someone, if they were really annoying, but you had a good time under the sheets." Eliza's second release "Pack Up" was released on 5 July 2010, reaching No. 5 on the Official UK Singles Chart on 11 July 2010.

In March 2011, she performed at the South by Southwest festival in Austin, Texas as well at Coachella in California. In April 2011, Eliza was touring the UK. On 19 April 2011, Eliza's self-titled album was released in the United States almost one year from the UK date.

In 2013, Eliza collaborated with Disclosure on the track "You & Me" from their debut album, Settle. Early that year, she began recording new material for her second album. In an interview with Elle magazine in April 2013, she stated "I'm definitely showing more of myself than I ever have before. I feel like on my last album, I hadn't experienced very much of anything really, and it's been three years or more since then and I have felt and seen things I hadn't before, and I know things I didn't know before. In a way I have answers to questions, but then those answers open up a thousand other questions. I guess I've gone through things that so many people go through at the age I am. I've written almost every day about my every thought and emotion and the album is made up of the songs that mean the most to me".

2013–2016: In Your Hands
On 7 June 2013, she premiered a new single called "Big When I Was Little", which was released in July 2013. It subsequently joined BBC Radio 1's playlist, and features on her second studio album. On 17 June 2013 the video for the single premiered on her YouTube channel.

Eliza and UK garage artist Wookie wrote a song called "The Hype" in 2013. Wookie contributed a remix to her album In Your Hands for her track "Walking on Water".

She featured on "YNSP", a track from hip hop artist Vic Mensa's Innanetape mixtape produced by DJ Dahi.

She had a cameo role as a nightclub singer in The Great Train Robbery, a drama series on BBC One in December 2013.

In 2014, Eliza was invited by Burt Bacharach to sing with him at Henley Festival in the Summer of 2014.

2016–: Re-brand, A Real Romantic, and A Sky Without Stars
In 2017 she re-branded her name from Eliza Doolittle to Eliza, and changed her sound. On 12 December 2018, her album A Real Romantic was released. In 2022, Eliza released a couple of new singles, "Straight Talker" and "Heat of the Moon" after signing to [PIAS]'s Log Off/Different Recordings, and a new album, A Sky Without Stars, was announced.

Discography

Studio albums

Extended plays

Singles

As lead artist

Promotional singles

As featured artist

Music videos

Tour
ELIZA just finished the A Sky Without Stars tour in the UK and the EU selling out KOKO in London.

Filmography

References

Footnotes

Sources

External links

Eliza Lovechild

1988 births
Living people
Parlophone artists
Singers from London
People from Westminster
People educated at Bedales School
English soul singers
English women pop singers
English people of Canadian descent
21st-century English women singers
21st-century English singers
British indie pop musicians